

House of Reginar, ?–964

Countess of Mons, 964–1086

Countess and Margravine of Valenciennes, 964–1086

House of Hainaut, 1070–1280

House of Avesnes, 1246–1257

House of Flanders, 1257–1280 

None

House of Avesnes, 1280–1354

House of Wittelsbach, 1354–1432

House of Valois-Burgundy, 1432–1482

House of Habsburg, 1482–1700

House of Bourbon, 1700–1706

House of Habsburg, 1706–1780

House of Habsburg-Lorraine, 1780–1795

House of Saxe-Coburg and Gotha, 1840–2002

See also 
Countess of Flanders
Countess of Holland
Countess of Zeeland
List of Bavarian consorts
List of Dutch consorts

Sources 
HAINAUT

 
Hainaut